Crimes against humanity are widespread or systemic criminal acts which are committed by or on behalf of a de facto authority, usually by or on behalf of a state, that grossly violate human rights. Unlike war crimes, crimes against humanity do not have to take place within the context of wars, and they apply to widespread practices rather than acts which are committed by individuals. Although crimes against humanity apply to acts which are committed by or on behalf of authorities, they do not need to be part of an official policy, and they only need to be tolerated by authorities. The first prosecution for crimes against humanity took place during the Nuremberg trials. Initially considered for legal use, widely in international law, following the Holocaust, a global standard of human rights was articulated in the Universal Declaration of Human Rights (1948). Political groups or states that violate or incite violations of human rights norms, as they are listed in the Declaration, are expressions of the political pathologies which are associated with crimes against humanity.

Since the Nuremberg trials, crimes against humanity have been prosecuted by other international courts (such as the International Criminal Tribunal for the former Yugoslavia, the International Criminal Tribunal for Rwanda, the Special Court for Sierra Leone, the Extraordinary Chambers in the Courts of Cambodia, and the International Criminal Court) as well as by domestic courts. The law of crimes against humanity has primarily been developed as a result of the evolution of customary international law. Crimes against humanity are not codified in an international convention, so an international effort to establish such a treaty, led by the Crimes Against Humanity Initiative, is currently underway.

Unlike war crimes, crimes against humanity can be committed during peace and war. They are not isolated or sporadic events because they are part of a government policy (although the perpetrators do not need to identify themselves with this policy) or they are part of a widespread practice of atrocities which is tolerated or condoned by a government or a de facto authority. War of aggression, war crimes, murder, massacres, dehumanization, genocide, ethnic cleansing, deportations, unethical human experimentation, extrajudicial punishments including summary executions, the use of weapons of mass destruction, state terrorism or state sponsorship of terrorism, death squads, kidnappings and forced disappearances, the use of child soldiers, unjust imprisonment, enslavement, torture, rape, political repression, racial discrimination, religious persecution and other human rights abuses may reach the threshold of crimes against humanity if they are part of a widespread or systematic practice.

Origins of the term
The term "crimes against humanity" is potentially ambiguous because of the ambiguity of the word "humanity", which can mean humankind (all human beings collectively) or the value of humanness. The history of the term shows that the latter sense is intended.

Abolition of the slave trade
In 1814, several bilateral treaties that were signed foreshadowed the signing of the multilateral treaty of the Final Act of the Congress of Vienna (1815) because they contained moral language and wording which expressed condemnation of the slave trade. For example, the Treaty of Paris between Britain and France (1814) included the wording "principles of natural justice"; and the British and United States plenipotentiaries stated in the Treaty of Ghent (1814) that the slave trade violated the "principles of humanity and justice".

The multilateral Declaration of the Powers, on the Abolition of the Slave Trade, of 8 February 1815 (which also formed Section XV of the Final Act of the Congress of Vienna of the same year) included in its first sentence the concept of the "principles of humanity and universal morality" as justification for ending a trade that was "odious in its continuance".

The Republican Party Platform for the 1856 election for President of the United States stated:

First uses of the term
On Sunday, June 4, 1854, at the Music Hall in Boston, the Unitarian minister and abolitionist Theodore Parker, preached a sermon which he titled "A new crime against humanity" in protest against the judicial proceedings which authorized the return of a man who was named Anthony Burns from Boston to Alexandria, Virginia, under the Fugitive Slave Act of 1850.

The Republican Platform for the 1860 election for President of the United States subsequently used the phrase in its ninth article:

The term "crimes against humanity" was used by George Washington Williams, an American minister, politician and historian, in a letter he wrote to the United States Secretary of State describing the atrocities committed by Leopold II of Belgium's administration in the Congo Free State in 1890. This was an early but not, as is often claimed, the first use of the term in its modern sense in the English language. In his first annual message in December 1889, U.S. President Harrison spoke about the slave trade in Africa as a "crime against humanity". Already in 1883, George Washington Williams used the same term in his reflections about slavery in the United States.

In treaty law, the term originated in the Second Hague Convention of 1899 preamble and was expanded in the Fourth Hague Convention of 1907 preamble and their respective regulations, which were concerned with the codification of new rules of international humanitarian law. The preamble of the two Conventions referenced the "laws of humanity" as an expression of underlying inarticulated humanistic values. The term is part of what is known as the Martens Clause.

On May 24, 1915, the Allied Powers, Britain, France, and Russia, jointly issued a statement explicitly and for the first time ever charging another government of committing "a crime against humanity". An excerpt from this joint statement reads:

At the conclusion of the war, an international war crimes commission recommended the creation of a tribunal to try "violations of the laws of humanity". However, the US representative objected to references to "law of humanity" as being imprecise and insufficiently developed at that time and the concept was not pursued.

Nonetheless, a UN report in 1948 referred to the usage of the term "crimes against humanity" in regard to the Armenian genocide as a precedent to the Nüremberg and Tokyo Charters. On May 15, 1948, the Economic and Social Council presented a 384-pages report prepared by the United Nations War Crimes Commission (UNWCC), set up in London (October 1943) to collect and collate information on war crimes and war criminals.  The report was in compliance to the request by the UN Secretary-General to make arrangements for "the collection and publication of information concerning human rights arising from trials of war criminals, quislings and traitors, and in particular from the Nuremberg trials and Tokyo Trials." The report had been prepared by members of the Legal Staff of the commission. The report is highly topical in regard to the Armenian Genocide, not only because it uses the 1915 events as a historic example, but also as a precedent to the Articles 6 (c) and 5 (c) of the Nuremberg and Tokyo Charters, and thereby as a precursor to the then newly adopted UN Genocide Convention, differentiating between war crimes and crimes against humanity. By refereeing to the information collected during WWI and put forward by the 1919 Commission of Responsibilities, the report entitled "Information Concerning Human Rights Arising from Trials of War Criminals" used the Armenian case as a vivid example of committed crimes by a state against its own citizens. The report also noted that while the Paris Peace Treaties with Germany, Austria, Hungary and Bulgaria, did not include any reference to "laws of humanity", instead basing the charges on violations of "laws and customs of war", The Sèvres Peace Treaty with Turkey did so. In addition to the Articles 226–228, concerning customs of war (corresponding to Articles 228–230 of the Treaty of Versailles), the Sèvres Treaty also contained an additional Article 230, obviously in compliance with the Allied ultimatum of May 24, 1915 in regard to committed "crimes against humanity and civilization".

Nuremberg trials

After the Second World War, the London Charter of the International Military Tribunal set down the laws and procedures by which the Nuremberg trials were to be conducted. The drafters of this document were faced with the problem of how to respond to the Holocaust and the grave crimes committed by the Nazi regime. A traditional understanding of war crimes gave no provision for crimes committed by a power on its own citizens. Therefore, Article 6 of the Charter was drafted to include not only traditional war crimes and crimes against peace, but also crimes against humanity, defined as

Under this definition, crimes against humanity could be punished only insofar as they could be connected somehow to war crimes or crimes against peace. The jurisdictional limitation was explained by the American chief representative to the London Conference, Robert H. Jackson, who pointed out that it "has been a general principle from time immemorial that the internal affairs of another government are not ordinarily our business". Thus, "it is justifiable that we interfere or attempt to bring retribution to individuals or to states only because the concentration camps and the deportations were in pursuance of a common plan or enterprise of making an unjust war". The judgement of the first Nuremberg trial found that "the policy of persecution, repression and murder of civilians" and persecution of Jews within Germany before the outbreak of war in 1939 were not crimes against humanity, because as "revolting and horrible as many of these crimes were, it has not been satisfactorily proved that they were done in execution of, or in connection with," war crimes or crimes against peace. The subsequent Nuremberg trials were conducted under Control Council Law No. 10 which included a revised definition of crimes against humanity with a wider scope.

Tokyo Trial

The International Military Tribunal for the Far East (IMTFE), also known as the Tokyo Trial, was convened to try the leaders of the Empire of Japan for three types of crimes: "Class A" (crimes against peace), "Class B" (war crimes), and "Class C" (crimes against humanity), committed during the Second World War.

The legal basis for the trial was established by the Charter of the International Military Tribunal for the Far East (CIMTFE) that was proclaimed on 19 January 1946. The tribunal convened on May 3, 1946, and was adjourned on November 12, 1948.

In the Tokyo Trial, Crimes against Humanity (Class C) was not applied for any suspect.  Prosecutions related to the Nanking Massacre were categorised as infringements upon the Laws of War.

A panel of eleven judges presided over the IMTFE, one each from victorious Allied powers (United States, Republic of China, Soviet Union, United Kingdom, the Netherlands, Provisional Government of the French Republic, Australia, New Zealand, Canada, British India, and the Philippines).

Types of crimes against humanity
The different types of crimes that may constitute crimes against humanity differ between definitions both internationally and on the domestic level. Isolated inhumane acts of a certain nature committed as part of a widespread or systematic attack may instead constitute grave infringements of human rights, or – depending on the circumstances – war crimes, but are not classified as crimes against humanity.

Apartheid

The systematic persecution of one racial group by another, such as occurred during the South African apartheid government, was recognized as a crime against humanity by the United Nations General Assembly in 1976. The Charter of the United Nations (Article 13, 14, 15) makes actions of the General Assembly advisory to the Security Council. In regard to apartheid in particular, the UN General Assembly has not made any findings, nor have apartheid-related trials for crimes against humanity been conducted.

Amnesty International has accused Israel of committing the crime of apartheid against Palestinians.

Rape and sexual violence
Neither the Nuremberg nor Tokyo Charters contained an explicit provision recognizing sexual and gender-based crimes as war crimes or crimes against humanity, although Control Council Law No. 10 recognized rape as a crime against humanity. The statutes of the International Criminal Tribunal for the former Yugoslavia and the International Criminal Tribunal for Rwanda both included rape as a crime against humanity. The ICC is the first international instrument expressly to include various forms of sexual and gender-based crimes including rape, sexual slavery, enforced prostitution, forced pregnancy, enforced sterilisation, and other forms of sexual violence as both an underlying act of crimes against humanity and war crime committed in international and/or non-international armed conflicts.

In 2008, the U.N. Security Council adopted resolution 1820, which noted that "rape and other forms of sexual violence can constitute war crimes, crimes against humanity or a constitutive act with respect to genocide".

On 14 April 2021, the Special Jurisdiction for Peace "accredited five LGBTI persons as victims of the Colombian armed conflict and resolved that their gender-based persecution might have amounted to a crime against humanity".

Legal status of crimes against humanity in international law
Unlike genocide and war crimes, which have been widely recognized and prohibited in international criminal law since the establishment of the Nuremberg principles, there has never been a comprehensive convention on crimes against humanity, even though such crimes are continuously perpetrated worldwide in numerous conflicts and crises. There are eleven international texts defining crimes against humanity, but they all differ slightly as to their definition of that crime and its legal elements. In 2008, the Crimes Against Humanity Initiative was launched to address this gap in international law.

On July 30, 2013, the United Nations International Law Commission voted to include the topic of crimes against humanity in its long-term program of work. In July 2014, the Commission moved this topic to its active programme of work based largely on a report submitted by Sean D. Murphy (the Special Rapporteur for Crimes Against Humanity).

There is some debate on the status of crimes against humanity under customary international law is. M. Cherif Bassiouni argues that crimes against humanity are part of jus cogens and as such constitute a non-derogable rule of international law.

United Nations
The United Nations has been primarily responsible for the prosecution of crimes against humanity since it was chartered in 1948.

After Nuremberg, there was no international court with jurisdiction over crimes against humanity for almost 50 years. However, work continued on developing the definition of crimes against humanity at the United Nations. For instance in 1947, the International Law Commission was charged by the United Nations General Assembly with the formulation of the principles of international law recognized and reinforced in the Nuremberg Charter and judgment, and they were also tasked with drafting a 'code of offenses against the peace and security of mankind'. Completed 50 years later in 1996, the Draft Code defined crimes against humanity as various inhumane acts, i.e., "murder, extermination, torture, enslavement, persecution on political, racial, religious or ethnic grounds, institutionalized discrimination, arbitrary deportation or forcible transfer of population, arbitrary imprisonment, rape, enforced prostitution and other inhuman acts committed in a systematic manner or on a large scale and instigated or directed by a Government or by any organization or group." This definition differs from the one used in Nuremberg, where the criminal acts were to have been committed "before or during the war", thus establishing a nexus between crimes against humanity and armed conflict.

On 21 March 2013, at its 22nd session, the United Nations Human Rights Council established the Commission of Inquiry on human rights in the Democratic People's Republic of Korea (DPRK). The Commission was mandated to investigate the systematic, widespread, and grave violations of human rights in the Democratic People's Republic of Korea, with a view to ensuring full accountability, in particular for violations that may amount to crimes against humanity. The Commission dealt with matters relating to crimes against humanity on the basis of definitions set out by customary international criminal law and in the Rome Statute of the International Criminal Court. The 2014 Report by the Commission found "the body of testimony and other information it received establishes that crimes against humanity have been committed in the Democratic People's Republic of Korea, pursuant to policies established at the highest level of the State [....] These crimes against humanity entail extermination, murder, enslavement, torture, imprisonment, rape, forced abortions and other sexual violence, persecution on political, religious, racial and gender grounds, the forcible transfer of populations, the enforced disappearance of persons and the inhumane act of knowingly causing prolonged starvation. The Commission further finds that crimes against humanity are ongoing in the Democratic People's Republic of Korea because the policies, institutions and patterns of impunity that lie at their heart remain in place." Additionally, the Commission found that crimes against humanity have been committed against starving populations, particularly during the 1990s and that they were still being committed against persons from other countries who were systematically abducted or denied repatriation because they sought to gain labour and other skills for the Democratic People's Republic of Korea.

Security Council
UN Security Council Resolution 1674, adopted by the United Nations Security Council on 28 April 2006, "reaffirms the provisions of paragraphs 138 and 139 of the 2005 World Summit Outcome Document regarding the responsibility to protect populations from genocide, war crimes, ethnic cleansing and crimes against humanity". The resolution commits the Council to action to protect civilians in armed conflict.

In 2008 the UN Security Council adopted resolution 1820, which noted that "rape and other forms of sexual violence can constitute war crimes, crimes against humanity or a constitutive act with respect to genocide".

According to the United Nations Security Council resolution 1970 (2011) concerning Libya, any direct or indirect trade of arms to the Libyan Arab Jamahiriya, in the form of supply, transfer, or sale should be prevented by the member nations. The arms embargo restricts the supply of arms, weapons, military vehicles, spare parts, technical assistance, finances, and the provision of armed mercenaries with origins of a country other than the one providing.

Later, the United Nations claimed in its November 2019 report that the United Arab Emirates, Jordan and Turkey were then violating the arms embargo imposed on Libya under the 1970 resolution. An airstrike on the migrant detention center in Tripoli in July 2019, believed to have been carried out by the United Arab Emirates, can be amounted as a war crime, as stated by the United Nations. The airstrike was deadlier than the 2011 militarized uprising that overthrew the regime of Muammar Gaddafi.

International courts and criminal tribunals
After the Nuremberg and Tokyo trials of 1945–1946, the next international tribunal with jurisdiction over crimes against humanity was not established for another five decades. In response to atrocities committed in the 1990s, multiple ad hoc tribunals were established with jurisdiction over crimes against humanity. The statutes of the International Criminal Court, the International Criminal Tribunals for the Former Yugoslavia and for Rwanda each contain different definitions of crimes against humanity.

International Criminal Tribunal for Yugoslavia

In 1993, the UN Security Council established the International Criminal Tribunal for the former Yugoslavia (ICTY), with jurisdiction to investigate and prosecute three international crimes which had taken place in the former Yugoslavia: genocide, war crimes, and crimes against humanity. Article 5 of the ICTY Statute states that 

This definition of crimes against humanity revived the original ‘Nuremberg’ nexus with armed conflict, connecting crimes against humanity to both international and non-international armed conflict. It also expanded the list of criminal acts used in Nuremberg to include imprisonment, torture and rape. Cherif Bassiouni has argued that this definition was necessary as the conflict in the former Yugoslavia was considered to be a conflict of both an international and non-international nature. Therefore, this adjusted definition of crimes against humanity was necessary to afford the tribunal jurisdiction over this crime.

International Criminal Tribunal for Rwanda

The UN Security Council established the International Criminal Tribunal for Rwanda in 1994 following the Rwandan genocide. Under the ICTR Statute, the link between crimes against humanity and an armed conflict of any kind was dropped. Rather, the requirement was added that the inhumane acts must be part of a "systematic or widespread attack against any civilian population on national, political, ethnic, racial or religious grounds." Unlike the conflict in the former Yugoslavia, the conflict in Rwanda was deemed to be non-international, so crimes against humanity would likely not have been applicable if the nexus to armed conflict had been maintained.

Special Court for Sierra Leone

Extraordinary Chambers in the Courts of Cambodia (ECCC)

International Criminal Court

In 2002, the International Criminal Court (ICC) was established in The Hague (Netherlands), and the Rome Statute provides for the ICC to have jurisdiction over genocide, crimes against humanity, and war crimes. ICC proceedings definitions of a "crime against humanity" have evolved significantly from its original legal definition or that used by the UN. Essentially, the Rome Statute employs the same definition of crimes against humanity that the ICTR Statute does, minus the requirement that the attack was carried out ‘on national, political, ethnic, racial or religious grounds’. In addition, the Rome Statute definition offers the most expansive list of specific criminal acts that may constitute crimes against humanity to date.

Article 7 of the treaty stated that:

The Rome Statute Explanatory Memorandum states that crimes against humanity

To fall under the Rome Statute, a crime against humanity which is defined in Article 7.1 must be "part of a widespread or systematic attack directed against any civilian population". Article 7.2.a states "For the purpose of paragraph 1: 'Attack directed against any civilian population means a course of conduct involving the multiple commission of acts referred to in paragraph 1 against any civilian population, pursuant to or in furtherance of a State or organizational policy to commit such attack'." This means that an individual crime on its own, or even a number of such crimes, would not fall under the Rome Statute unless they were the result of a State policy or an organizational policy. This was confirmed by Luis Moreno Ocampo in an open letter publishing his conclusions about allegations of crimes committed during the invasion of Iraq in March 2003 which might fall under the ICC. In a section entitled "Allegations concerning Genocide and Crimes against Humanity," Ocampo states that "the available information provided no reasonable indicator of the required elements for a crime against humanity," i.e., 'a widespread or systematic attack directed against any civilian population'".

The ICC can only prosecute crimes against humanity in situations under which it has jurisdiction. The ICC only has jurisdiction over crimes contained in its statute – genocide, war crimes and crimes against humanity – which have been committed on the territory of a State party to the Rome Statute, when a non-party State refers a situation within its country to the court, or when the United Nation Security Council refers a case to the ICC. In 2005 the UN referred to the ICC the situation in Darfur. This referral resulted in an indictment of Sudanese President Omar al-Bashir for genocide, crimes against humanity, and war crimes in 2008. When the ICC President reported to the UN regarding its progress handling these crimes against humanity case, Judge Phillipe Kirsch said "The Court does not have the power to arrest these persons. That is the responsibility of States and other actors. Without arrests, there can be no trials.

Council of Europe
The Committee of Ministers of the Council of Europe on 30 April 2002 issued a recommendation to the member states, on the protection of women against violence. In the section "Additional measures concerning violence in conflict and post-conflict situations", states in paragraph 69 that member states should: "penalize rape, sexual slavery, forced pregnancy, enforced sterilization or any other form of sexual violence of comparable gravity as an intolerable violation of human rights, as crimes against humanity and, when committed in the context of an armed conflict, as war crimes;"

In the Explanatory Memorandum on this recommendation when considering paragraph 69:

The Holodomor has been recognized as a crime against humanity by the European Parliament.

20th century 

Sources say the 20th century can be considered the bloodiest period in global history. Millions of civilian infants, children, adults, and elderly people died in warfare. One civilian perished for every combatant killed. Efforts of the International Committee of the Red Cross, humanitarian laws, and rules of warfare were not able to stop these crimes against humanity. These terminologies were invented since previous vocabulary was not enough to describe these offenses. War criminals did not fear prosecution, apprehension, or imprisonment before World War II. Britain's Prime Minister Winston Churchill favored the outright execution of war criminals. The United States was more lenient and called for a just trial. The British Government was convinced to institute the Nuremberg Trial which left several legacies. These are worldwide jurisdiction for severe war crimes, creation of international war crime tribunals, judicial procedures that documented history of colossal crimes effectively, and success of UN courts in holding impartial trials.

The UN pointed out the Rome Statute of the International Criminal Court (ICC) specifically Article 7 (Crimes against Humanity), which defines large-scale acts of violence against a locality's civilian populace. These acts consist of murder; annihilation; enslavement; bondage; forced removal of the population; imprisonment or deprivation of physical liberty that violates international laws; maltreatment; forced prostitution and rape; discrimination and tyranny against certain groups; apartheid (racial discrimination and segregation); and, other inhumane acts. A publication from Trial International mentioned that crimes against humanity have been collated starting in 1990. These were the 1993 Statute of the International Criminal Tribunal for Yugoslavia, 1994 Statute of the International Tribunal for Rwanda, and 1998 Rome Statute of the International Criminal Court. The latter contains the latest and most extensive list of detailed crimes against civilians.

21st century
A report on the 2008–09 Gaza War by Richard Goldstone accused Palestinian and Israeli forces of possibly committing a crime against humanity. The report concluded that Israel had used disproportionate force, targeted Palestinian civilians, used them as human shields, and destroyed civilian infrastructure. Hamas was found to have deliberately targeted Israeli civilians and Israeli infrastructure by mounting indiscriminate rocket attacks. Both the Israeli government and Hamas dismissed the findings of the report.

In 2019, United Nations investigators announced that Israeli troops may have committed crimes against humanity. During the Gaza protests 189 Palestinians were killed, investigators said, 183 were shot with live ammunition, including 35 children, three health workers, and two journalists. Amnesty International has accused Israel of committing the crime of apartheid against Palestinians

In 2022, the UN Human Rights Office assessment of human rights concerns in Xinjiang concluded that the extent of arbitrary and discriminatory detention of members of Uyghur and other predominantly Muslim groups in China, since 2017, pursuant to law and policy, in context of restrictions and deprivation more generally of fundamental rights enjoyed individually and collectively, may constitute international crimes, in particular crimes against humanity.

The Myanmar military's targeting of the Rohingya Muslims in which more than 25,000 have been killed and more than 18,000 women and girls have been systematically raped have been labelled as crimes against humanity by United Nations and Amnesty International. OHCHR Independent Fact-Finding Mission have found Tatmadaw of commiting crimes against humanity, genocide, and ethnic cleansing.

See also 

 Charter of the United Nations
 Crimes against humanity under communist regimes
 Crimes Against Humanity Initiative
 Genocide Convention
 Historical revisionism (negationism)
 Hate crimes
 Honor killing
 Human rights
 Inter-American Commission on Human Rights
 International Criminal Court
 Mass atrocity crimes
 Rome Statute of the International Criminal Court
 Rule of Law
 Vienna Declaration and Programme of Action
 War crimes
 Universal jurisdiction

References

Further reading

 Christopher R. Browning, "The Two Different Ways of Looking at Nazi Murder" (review of Philippe Sands, East West Street:  On the Origins of "Genocide" and "Crimes Against Humanity", Knopf, 425 pp., $32.50; and Christian Gerlach, The Extermination of the European Jews, Cambridge University Press, 508 pp., $29.99 [paper]), The New York Review of Books, vol. LXIII, no. 18 (November 24, 2016), pp. 56–58.  Discusses Hersch Lauterpacht's legal concept of "crimes against humanity", contrasted with Rafael Lemkin's legal concept of "genocide".  All genocides are crimes against humanity, but not all crimes against humanity are genocides; genocides require a higher standard of proof, as they entail intent to destroy a particular group.
 
 
 
(fr) Jean Albert (dir.), L'avenir de la justice pénale internationale, Institut Presage, Bruylant, 2018, 383 p.

External links

 Crimes of War project
 Rule of Law in Armed Conflicts Project
 What is a Crime Against Humanity? – an online video
 Genocide & Crimes Against Humanity – a learning resource, highlighting the cases of Myanmar, Bosnia, the DRC, and Darfur
 Crimes Against Humanity – Bibliographies on the topics of the International Law Commission & International Law Seminar  (UNOG Library)

 
Human rights abuses
International criminal law
Torture
War crimes
1890s neologisms